Brian Edgar (26 March 1936 – 5 October 2001) was an English rugby union, and professional rugby league footballer who played in the 1950s and 1960s.

Background
Brian Edgar was born in Great Broughton, Cumberland, England, and he died aged 65 in Seaton, Cumbria.

Playing career

International honours
Edgar won a cap for England (RL) while at Workington in 1962 against France, and won caps for Great Britain (RL) while at Workington in 1958 against Australia, and New Zealand, in 1961 against New Zealand, in 1962 against Australia (3 matches), and New Zealand, in 1965 against New Zealand, and in 1966 against Australia (3 matches).

Edgar and Leeds' Joseph "Joe" Thompson are the only Forwards to be selected for three Australasian tours.

Four Workington players were selected for the 1958 tour of Australia, and New Zealand; Harry Archer, Brian Edgar, Ike Southward and Bill Wookey (later of Barrow).

Challenge Cup Final appearances
Brian Edgar played right-, i.e. number 12, in Workington Town's 12-21 defeat by Barrow in the 1955 Challenge Cup Final during the 1954-55 season at Wembley Stadium, London on Saturday 30 April 1955, in front of a crowd of 66,513, and played left-, i.e. number 11, in the 9–13 defeat by Wigan in the 1958 Challenge Cup Final during the 1957–58 season at Wembley Stadium, London on Saturday 10 May 1958.

Honoured at Workington Town
Brian Edgar is a Workington Town Hall Of Fame Inductee.

References

External links
Obituary in The Independent
(archived by web.archive.org) » Legends Evening 60's
(archived by web.archive.org) Workington and Hull KR triumph in the regions
(archived by archive.is) "Call for Edgar to be in RL Hall of Fame" J Wright (16 December 2005) The Whitehaven News

1936 births
2001 deaths
Cumberland rugby league team players
England national rugby league team players
English rugby league players
English rugby union players
Great Britain national rugby league team captains
Great Britain national rugby league team players
Rugby league players from Broughton, Cumbria
Rugby league props
Rugby league second-rows
Rugby union players from Broughton, Cumbria
Workington Town players